Harold Hallman (December 10, 1962 – December 23, 2005) was a Canadian Football League defensive tackle who played eight seasons in the CFL,  mainly for the Toronto Argonauts. Hallman was a four-time All Star and won a Grey Cup with Toronto in 1991. He also won both the CFL's Most Outstanding Rookie Award and the Jackie Parker Trophy in 1986. He was drafted by the San Francisco 49ers of the NFL in the 10th round of the 1986 NFL Draft, after playing college football at Auburn University. His selection by the 49ers was made following a recommendation to 49ers head coach Bill Walsh by actor Bradford Dillman. Hallman died in a Macon, Georgia hospital after surgical complications.

College career 

Hallman played college football at Auburn University.  He was a starting nose guard for three seasons.

References 

1962 births
2005 deaths
Auburn Tigers football players
Calgary Stampeders players
Canadian football defensive linemen
Sportspeople from Macon, Georgia
Toronto Argonauts players
Canadian Football League Rookie of the Year Award winners
Players of American football from Georgia (U.S. state)